Saint-Hilaire-Fontaine is a commune in the Nièvre department, in central France.

See also
Communes of the Nièvre department

References

Communes of Nièvre